Takapūwāhia, also known as Porirua Pa, was originally built on one of the oldest settlements in the Porirua basin called Te Urukahika, a small hamlet located on the western shore of Porirua harbour in the lower (southern) North Island of New Zealand.

In the 1850s Takapūwāhia had a population of over 250 Māori people As the crown acquired more iwi land for Pakeha settlement the wider iwi was invited to settle in Porirua by Ngati Maunu, the senior hapu of Ngati Toa. Families came from Pukerua Bay and Taupo Pa, now known as Plimmerton. Then in 1889 the settlement moved from Te Urukahika (Elsdon) to its current location and became the primary home to Ngāti Toa Rangatira In 1910 a school was built next to the wharenui.

The settlement includes Takapūwāhia Marae, a marae (tribal meeting ground) of Ngāti Toa Rangatira. The marae includes a wharenui (meeting house), known as Toa Rangatira.

Demographics
Takapūwāhia is combined with the neighbouring suburb of Elsdon for statistical purposes.

Education

The school was founded in 1957.

References

Suburbs of Porirua